The National Federation of Fish Friers (NFFF) is a British trade association for the fish and chips trade.

Structure
Its headquarters are in Leeds, West Yorkshire. Standard membership as of 2017 is £193 a year. It has 12 regions.

History
It was founded in 1913 and has about 8,500 members.

Function
It runs training courses and speaks for the trade. It runs the Customer Service Skills and Fish Frying Skills qualifications for the Seafish authority.

Awards
It runs the Young Fish Frier of the Year Award.

Publications
Its monthly magazine The Fish Friers Review (no apostrophe) was founded as The National Fish Caterers’ Review in 1925.

See also
 List of fish and chip restaurants
Seafish
 British Potato Council

References

Further reading
 - note that Googlebooks unfortunately omits page 117-118 which appear to cover the founding of the NFFF.

External links

Organisations based in Leeds
Food industry trade groups based in the United Kingdom
Organizations established in 1913
Meanwood
Fish and chip restaurants
1913 establishments in the United Kingdom